Nicolaj Madsen (born 16 July 1988) is a Danish professional footballer who plays as a midfielder for Icelandic 1. deild club Vestri.

Club career
On 31 August 2018, Madsen left Vejle Boldklub and returned to HB Køge in October 2018 on a contract for the rest of the year.

On 2 September 2019 it was confirmed, that Madsen had joined German club SpVgg Unterhaching and would play on loan at TSV 1860 Rosenheim for the 2019–20 season.

Madsen moved to Icelandic 1. deild club Vestri on 12 February 2021, signing alongside compatriot Casper Gandrup. He returned to HB Køge on a short loan in January 2022, but returned to Vestri in March 2022.

References

External links

1988 births
Living people
Danish men's footballers
Danish expatriate men's footballers
Association football midfielders
Herfølge Boldklub players
HB Køge players
SønderjyskE Fodbold players
Vejle Boldklub players
SpVgg Unterhaching players
TSV 1860 Rosenheim players
Vestri (football club) players
Danish Superliga players
Danish 1st Division players
Regionalliga players
1. deild karla players
Danish expatriate sportspeople in Germany
Danish expatriate sportspeople in Iceland
Expatriate footballers in Germany
Expatriate footballers in Iceland
People from Faxe Municipality
Sportspeople from Region Zealand